Jumbo Mountain is an  mountain summit located in Powell County of the U.S. state of Montana.

Description

Jumbo Mountain is located in the Swan Range, which is a subset of the Rocky Mountains. It is situated in the Bob Marshall Wilderness, on land managed by Flathead National Forest. Precipitation runoff from the mountain drains into headwaters of the South Fork Flathead River. The active fire lookout at the top was built in 1957, having replaced a cabin originally built in 1937.

Climate

Based on the Köppen climate classification, Jumbo Mountain is located in a subarctic climate zone characterized by long, usually very cold winters, and short, cool to mild summers. Winter temperatures can drop below −10 °F with wind chill factors below −30 °F.

Gallery

See also
 Geology of the Rocky Mountains

References

External links
 Weather: Jumbo Mountain

Mountains of Montana
North American 2000 m summits
Flathead National Forest